The Rawson House is a historic building along Clifton Avenue in Cincinnati, Ohio, United States.

History
Erected circa 1870, it has been ranked as a fine example of the Italian Villa style of architecture. Built with brick walls and elements of wood and stone, it was originally the home of Jacob Lloyd Wayne. Later, the house was sold to Joseph Rawson, who was the president of a local meat packing firm and then the vice-president of the city's First National Bank.

National Register of Historic Places
In 1973, the Rawson House was listed on the National Register of Historic Places. Non-archaeological historic sites in the United States qualify to be listed on the National Register by passing any of three different criteria: significant historical role, relation to a historically significant person, or historically significant architecture. It is possible for properties to meet more than one criterion; the Rawson House fit all three. Five years later, a group of properties along Clifton Avenue were designated a historic district, the Clifton Avenue Historic District; the Rawson House is a contributing property to that district.

References

Houses in Cincinnati
Houses on the National Register of Historic Places in Ohio
Italianate architecture in Ohio
National Register of Historic Places in Cincinnati
Historic district contributing properties in Ohio